The Women's 60 metres event  at the 2011 European Athletics Indoor Championships was held on March 5–6, 2011 with the final on March 6 at 16:40.

Records

Results

Heats
First 3 in each heat and 4 best performers advanced to the Semifinals.

Semifinals 
First 4 in each heat advanced to the Final.

Final 

The final was held at 16:40.

References 

60 metres at the European Athletics Indoor Championships
2011 European Athletics Indoor Championships
2011 in women's athletics